Central Italian (Italian: dialetti mediani) refers to Italo-Romance varieties spoken in the so-called Area Mediana, which covers a swathe of the central Italian peninsula. Area Mediana is also used in a narrower sense to describe the southern part, in which case the northern one may be referred to as the Area Perimediana, a distinction that will be made throughout this article. The two areas are split along a line running approximately from Rome in the southwest to Ancona in the northeast.

Background 
In the early Middle Ages, Central Italian extended north into Romagna and covered all of modern-day Lazio, Abruzzo, and Molise. Since then, however, the dialects spoken in those areas have been assimilated into Gallo-Italic and Southern Italo-Romance respectively. In addition, the dialect of Rome has undergone considerable Tuscanization from the fifteenth century onwards, such that it has lost many of its Central Italian features.

Phonological features 
Except for its southern fringe, the Area Mediana is characterized by a contrast between the final vowels /-u/ and /-o/, which distinguishes it from both the Area Perimediana and from Southern Italo-Romance. Cf. Spoletine [ˈkreːto, ˈtittu] < Latin crēdō, tēctum 'I believe, roof'. An additional isogloss that runs along the border between the two areas, but often overlaps it in either direction, is that of post-nasal plosive voicing, as in [manˈt̬ellu] 'cloak'. This is a feature that the Area Mediana shares with neighbouring Southern Italo-Romance.

In the Area Mediana are found the following vocalic phenomena:

 In most areas, stressed mid-vowels are raised by one degree of aperture if the following syllable contains either /u/ or /i/. This is referred to as 'Sabine metaphony'. Compare the following examples from the Ascrean dialect:
 [meːla, miːlu] 'apples, apple'
 [ʃpoːsa, ʃpuːsu] 'wife, husband'
 [wɛcca, weccu] 'old' (f./m.)
 [nᴐːwa, noːwu] 'new' (f./m.)

 In a few areas, metaphony results in diphthongization for stressed low-mid vowels, while high-mids undergo normal raising to /i, u/. Compare the following examples from the Nursine dialect:
 [metto, mitti] 'I put, you put'
[soːla, suːlu] 'alone' (f./m.)
[bbɛlla, bbjɛjju] 'beautiful' (f./m.)
 [mᴐrte, mwᴐrti] 'death, dead (pl.)'
 Southeast of Rome, around Nemi, low-mid vowels undergo metaphonic diphthongization, while high-mids resist raising to /i, u/. This was also the case for Old Romanesco, which had alternations such as /ˈpɛde, ˈpjɛdi/ 'foot, feet'.
 In some areas with Sabine metaphony, if a word has a stressed mid-vowel, then final /-u/ lowers to /-o/ in a sort of height-based vowel harmony. Compare */ˈbɛllu, ˈfreddu/ > /ˈbeʎʎu, ˈfriddu/ (metaphony) > Tornimpartese /ˈbeʎʎo, ˈfriddu/ 'beautiful, cold'.

Sound-changes (or lack thereof) that distinguish most or all of Central Italian from Tuscan include the following, many of them shared with Southern Italo-Romance:

 /nd/ > /nn/, as in Latin vēndere > [ˈwenne] 'to sell'.
 /mb, nv/ > /mm/, as in Latin plumbum > [ˈpjummu] 'lead'.
 /ld/ > /ll/, as in Latin cal(i)da > [ˈkalla] 'hot'.
 Retention of /j/, as in Latin Maium > [ˈmaːju] 'May'.
 /mj/ > /ɲ(ɲ)/, as in Latin vindēmia > [wenˈneɲɲa] 'grape harvest'.
 /rj/ > /r/, as in Latin caprārium > [kraˈpaːru] 'goatherd'.
Sound-changes with a limited distribution within the Area Mediana include:

 /ɡ-/ > /j/ or ∅, as in Latin cattum > [ˈɡattu] > Nursine [ˈjjattu], Reatine [ˈattu] 'cat'.

 /ɡn/ > /(i̯)n/, as in Latin agnum, ligna > Tagliacozzese /ˈai̯nu, ˈlena/ 'lamb, firewood'.
 /d, v/ > ∅ word-initially and intervocalically, as in Latin dentem, vaccam, crudum, ovum > /ɛnte akka kruː ou/ in Rieti and L'Aquila.
 Around Terni, and to its immediate northeast, this deletion only applies in intervocalic position.
In the north of the Area Perimediana, a number of Gallo-Italic features are found:

 /a/ > /ɛ/ in stressed open syllables, as in /ˈpa.ne/ > /ˈpɛ.ne/ 'bread', around Perugia and areas to its north.
 In the same area, habitual reduction or deletion of vowels in unstressed internal syllables, as in /ˈtrappole/ > /ˈtrapp(ə)le/ 'traps'.
 Voicing of intervocalic /t/ to /d/ and degemination of long consonants around Ancona and to its west.
 In both of the aforementioned areas: lack, or reversal, of the sound-changes /nd/ > /nn/ and /mb, nv/ > /mm/ that are found in the rest of Central Italian.
The following changes to final vowels are found in the Area Perimediana:

 /-u/ > /-o/, as in Latin musteum > Montelaghese [ˈmoʃʃo], everywhere except for a small 'island' around Pitigliano.
 /-i/ > /-e/, as in /i ˈkani/ > /e ˈkane/ 'the dogs', in some of the dialects situated along a long arc from Montalto di Castro in the southwest to Fabriano in the northeast.

Morphological features 
 In part of the Area Mediana, below a line running northeast from Rome to Rieti and Norcia, the 3PL ending of non-first conjugation verbs is, unusually, /-u/ (rather than /-o/), which acts as a trigger for metaphony. Cf. Latin vēndunt > Leonessan [ˈvinnu] 'they sell'.
 In the same area, a series of irregular first-conjugation verbs also show 3PL /-u/ (as opposed to the /-o/ or /-onno/ found elsewhere). Examples include [au, dau, fau, vau] 'they have/give/do/go'.

 Latin fourth-declension nouns have been retained as such in many cases. Cf. Latin manum, manūs 'hand(s)' > Fabrichese [ˈmaːno] (invariant) and Latin fīcum, fīcūs 'fig(s)' > Canepinese [ˈfiːko] (invariant).
 Latin neuters of the -um/-a type survive more extensively than in Tuscan. Cf. Latin olīvētum, olīvēta > Roiatese [liˈviːtu, leˈveːta] 'olive-grove(s)'. Even originally non-neuter nouns are sometimes drawn into this class, as in Latin hortum, hortī > Segnese [ˈᴐrto, ˈᴐrta] 'garden(s)'.
 The plurals, which are grammatically feminine, are replaced by the feminine ending /-e/ in some dialects, leading to outcomes such as Spoletine [ˈlabbru, ˈlabbre] 'lip(s)'. Both plurals may also alternate within the same dialect, as in Treiese [ˈᴐːa~ˈᴐːe] 'eggs'.
 The Latin neuter plural /-ora/, as in tempora 'times', was extended to several other words in medieval times, but today the phenomenon is limited to areas such as Serrone, where one finds cases like [ˈraːmo, ˈraːmora] 'branch(es)'. In Serviglianese, the final vowel changes to /-e/, as in [ˈfiːko, ˈfiːkore] 'fig(s)'.

 In several dialects, final syllables beginning with /n/, /l/, or /r/ may be deleted in masculine nouns. In varieties such as Matelicese, this occurs only in the singular, not the plural, leading to outcomes such as */paˈtrone, paˈtroni/ > [paˈtro, paˈtruːni] 'lord, lords'. In varieties such as Serviglianese, this deletion occurs both in the singular and the plural, resulting in [paˈtro, paˈtru], with metaphony-induced vowel distinctions remaining as a marker of number.

Syntactic features 
 Direct objects are often marked by the preposition a if they are animate.

See also
Central Marchigiano dialect
Languages of Italy

References

Bibliography
 Loporcaro, Michele & Paciaroni, Tania. 2016. The dialects of central Italy. In Ledgeway, Adam & Maiden, Martin (eds.), The Oxford guide to the Romance languages, 228–245. Oxford University Press.
Vignuzzi, Ugo. 1997. Lazio, Umbria, and the Marche. In Maiden, Martin & Parry, Mair (eds.), The dialects of Italy, 311–320. London: Routledge.

Dialects of Italian